Kampong Batu Apoi is a village in Temburong District, Brunei, about  from the district town Bangar. The population was 106 in 2016. It is one of the villages within Mukim Batu Apoi. The postcode is PC1151.

Facilities 
Sultan Hashim Primary School is the village's government primary school. It also shares grounds with Sultan Hashim Religious School, the village's government school for the country's Islamic religious primary education.

The village mosque is Kampong Batu Apoi Mosque. It was inaugurated on 4 September 1987 and can accommodate 200 worshippers.

The village is also home to the PKBN Base Training Camp, the country's voluntary military national service.

References 

Batu Apoi